David Hugh Polkinghorne (born 1 February 1956) is a former Australian rules footballer who played with Hawthorn in the VFL.

Polkinghorne was a defender who played on the half back flanks and back pockets for Hawthorn. Renowned for his awkward kicking style, he played in Hawthorn premiership teams in 1976 and 1978.

In the 1982 Qualifying Final against Carlton he was struck in the face by Wayne Johnston and then gave evidence against him at the tribunal, thus breaking a code of silence. Johnston was found guilty and suspended.

References

Article on News.com.au

1956 births
Living people
People educated at Scotch College, Melbourne
Hawthorn Football Club players
Hawthorn Football Club Premiership players
Australian rules footballers from Victoria (Australia)
Two-time VFL/AFL Premiership players